Julian Letterlough (December 25, 1969 – July 8, 2005) was an American professional boxer from Harrisburg, Pennsylvania. Known as "Mr. KO", Letterlough was boxer who was often featured on ESPN.

Pro career
Letterlough became a professional boxer in 1998 at the late age of 28 after a seven-year stint in prison for assault. He fought as a light heavyweight and was unbeaten in his first 16 fights. 
  
He fought against Julio César González in 2001, a fight in which González was down three times, and Letterlough down twice. González won by decision. Later that year, he got a shot at International Boxing Federation cruiserweight titleholder Vassiliy Jirov, but  lost in the 8th round by TKO. He lost a decision later that year to David Telesco, and in 2003 was knocked out by Richard Hall. In 2004 he fought a draw against Daniel Judah, a fight in which Judah went down in round five and was docked a point for holding in round seven.

Professional boxing record

|-
|align="center" colspan=8|21 Wins (20 knockouts, 1 decision), 5 Losses (2 knockouts, 3 decisions), 3 Draws 
|-
| align="center" style="border-style: none none solid solid; background: #e3e3e3"|Result
| align="center" style="border-style: none none solid solid; background: #e3e3e3"|Record
| align="center" style="border-style: none none solid solid; background: #e3e3e3"|Opponent
| align="center" style="border-style: none none solid solid; background: #e3e3e3"|Type
| align="center" style="border-style: none none solid solid; background: #e3e3e3"|Round
| align="center" style="border-style: none none solid solid; background: #e3e3e3"|Date
| align="center" style="border-style: none none solid solid; background: #e3e3e3"|Location
| align="center" style="border-style: none none solid solid; background: #e3e3e3"|Notes
|-align=center
|Win
|
|align=left| Eric Starr
|TKO
|2
|01/10/2004
|align=left| Reading, Pennsylvania, U.S.
|align=left|
|-
|Draw
|
|align=left| Daniel Judah
|PTS
|12
|17/04/2004
|align=left| Tampa, Florida, U.S.
|align=left|
|-
|Win
|
|align=left| Tony Menefee
|TKO
|5
|23/01/2004
|align=left| Atlantic City, New Jersey, U.S.
|align=left|
|-
|Loss
|
|align=left| Faustino González
|MD
|6
|29/08/2003
|align=left| Reading, Pennsylvania, U.S.
|align=left|
|-
|Loss
|
|align=left| Richard Hall
|TKO
|2
|18/07/2003
|align=left| Hyannis, Massachusetts, U.S.
|align=left|
|-
|Win
|
|align=left| Stacy Goodson
|TKO
|1
|27/03/2003
|align=left| Fort Lauderdale, Florida, U.S.
|align=left|
|-
|Draw
|
|align=left| John Douglas
|PTS
|6
|15/11/2002
|align=left| Dorchester, Massachusetts, U.S.
|align=left|
|-
|Win
|
|align=left| Lloyd Bryan
|TKO
|4
|22/06/2002
|align=left| Reading, Pennsylvania, U.S.
|align=left|
|-
|Loss
|
|align=left| David Telesco
|UD
|10
|18/01/2002
|align=left| Raleigh, North Carolina, U.S.
|align=left|
|-
|Loss
|
|align=left| Vassiliy Jirov
|TKO
|8
|08/09/2001
|align=left| Reno, Nevada, U.S.
|align=left|
|-
|Win
|
|align=left| Ka-Dy King
|KO
|2
|22/06/2001
|align=left| Harrisburg, Pennsylvania, U.S.
|align=left|
|-
|Win
|
|align=left| Dennis McKinney
|UD
|6
|08/04/2001
|align=left| Reading, Pennsylvania, U.S.
|align=left|
|-
|Loss
|
|align=left| Julio César González
|UD
|12
|02/02/2001
|align=left| Columbus, Ohio, U.S.
|align=left|
|-
|Win
|
|align=left| Max Heyman
|TKO
|5
|17/11/2000
|align=left| Stateline, Nevada, U.S.
|align=left|
|-
|Draw
|
|align=left| Sam Ahmad
|PTS
|10
|22/09/2000
|align=left| Philadelphia, Pennsylvania, U.S.
|align=left|
|-
|Win
|
|align=left| Demetrius Jenkins
|TKO
|7
|14/07/2000
|align=left| Hampton Beach, New Hampshire, U.S.
|align=left|
|-
|Win
|
|align=left| Manny Rose
|TKO
|1
|09/06/2000
|align=left| Harrisburg, Pennsylvania, U.S.
|align=left|
|-
|Win
|
|align=left| Troy Weaver
|TKO
|1
|09/04/2000
|align=left| Stateline, Nevada, U.S.
|align=left|
|-
|Win
|
|align=left| Vinson Durham
|KO
|2
|11/02/2000
|align=left| Reading, Pennsylvania, U.S.
|align=left|
|-
|Win
|
|align=left| Darryl Hollowell
|KO
|6
|18/11/1999
|align=left| Glen Burnie, Maryland, U.S.
|align=left|
|-
|Win
|
|align=left| Eric Davis
|KO
|3
|29/10/1999
|align=left| Philadelphia, Pennsylvania, U.S.
|align=left|
|-
|Win
|
|align=left| Napoleon Pitt
|TKO
|3
|25/09/1999
|align=left| Harrisburg, Pennsylvania, U.S.
|align=left|
|-
|Win
|
|align=left| Charles Lee
|TKO
|5
|18/06/1999
|align=left| Harrisburg, Pennsylvania, U.S.
|align=left|
|-
|Win
|
|align=left| Felton Hamilton
|KO
|5
|09/04/1999
|align=left| Waldorf, Maryland, U.S.
|align=left|
|-
|Win
|
|align=left| Dana Rucker
|KO
|3
|25/03/1999
|align=left| Glen Burnie, Maryland, U.S.
|align=left|
|-
|Win
|
|align=left| Ricardo Dabney
|KO
|1
|29/01/1999
|align=left| Atlantic City, New Jersey, U.S.
|align=left|
|-
|Win
|
|align=left| Ted Megginson
|KO
|1
|16/12/1998
|align=left| Glenarden, Maryland, U.S.
|align=left|
|-
|Win
|
|align=left| Cleveland Issacs
|TKO
|3
|03/12/1998
|align=left| Allentown, Pennsylvania, U.S.
|align=left|
|-
|Win
|
|align=left| Byron Jones
|TKO
|2
|23/10/1998
|align=left| Reading, Pennsylvania, U.S.
|align=left|
|}

Murder
Letterlough was shot in the back and killed while leaving a bar with his wife in Reading, Pennsylvania, on July 8, 2005.

References

External links 
 

1969 births
2005 deaths
Light-heavyweight boxers
Boxers from Pennsylvania
Male murder victims
Deaths by firearm in Pennsylvania
People murdered in Pennsylvania
Sportspeople from Harrisburg, Pennsylvania
American male boxers